Maddingley is a suburb of Bacchus Marsh, a peri-urban town in central Victoria, Australia. The locality consists of the portion of the Bacchus Marsh urban area south of the Werribee River.

Items of interest in Maddingley include the Bacchus Marsh railway station, Bacchus Marsh College, Bacchus Marsh Grammar School and the Maddingley brown coal mine.  Maddingley Park, including the Nieuwesteeg Heritage Rose Garden, is adjacent to the railway station.

References

External links

Bacchus Marsh